Frank Bertram Brooks (1884–1952) was a Southern Rhodesian sportsman who represented his country as a cricketer, a rugby union player and as a tennis player.

Biography

Born in Bombay, Bombay Presidency, British India, on 10 September 1884, Frank Brooks was educated at Bedford School. He was a member of one of 
Southern Rhodesia's greatest sporting families, and the younger brother of Freddie Brooks OBE. He represented Southern Rhodesia in cricket, between 1909 and 1922, in rugby union and in tennis, and was Rhodesian men's doubles champion for twenty-one years, between 1910 and 1931.

Frank Brooks died in Salisbury, Southern Rhodesia, on 19 August 1952, aged 67.

References

1884 births
1952 deaths
People educated at Bedford School
British people in colonial India
Rhodesia cricketers
Bedfordshire cricketers
Rhodesian rugby union players
British emigrants to Rhodesia
Cricketers from Mumbai
Rhodesian male tennis players